Daniel Curtin may refer to:

 Dan Curtin (1898–1980), Australian politician
 Daniel R. Curtin (1855–1916), American businessman, farmer, and politician